The 1942 Ottawa Rough Riders finished in 1st place in the Ottawa City Senior Rugby Football Union with a 3–1 record while the Interprovincial Rugby Football Union suspended operations due to World War II. The Rough Riders lost the OCSRFU Final to the Ottawa RCAF Uplands.

Regular season

Standings

Schedule

Postseason

Playoffs

References

Ottawa Rough Riders seasons